is a Japanese manga series written and illustrated by Minoru Toyoda. It was originally a one-shot published in Shogakukan's Monthly Shōnen Sunday in April 2016, before being serialized in the same magazine from September 2017 to July 2020, with its chapters collected in seven tankōbon volumes.

Publication
Kongōji-san wa Mendōkusai is written and illustrated by Minoru Toyoda. The manga was originally a one-shot published in Shogakukan's Monthly Shōnen Sunday on April 12, 2016. It was later serialized in the same magazine from September 12, 2017, to July 10, 2020.<ref></p></ref><ref></p></ref> Shogakukan collected its chapters in seven tankōbon volumes, released from March 12, 2018, to September 11, 2020.

Volume list

Reception
Kongōji-san wa Mendōkusai ranked 2nd, behind Heavenly Delusion, on Takarajimasha's Kono Manga ga Sugoi! 2019 ranking of Top 20 manga series for male readers. The series was nominated for the 12th Manga Taishō in 2019, and placed 7th with 39 points.

See also
Love Roma, another manga series by the same author

References

External links
 

Romantic comedy anime and manga
Shogakukan manga
Shōnen manga